Ferrard is a barony in County Louth, Republic of Ireland.

Etymology
Ferrard derives its name from Fera Arda Ciannachta, "men of the high Ciannachta", referring to the uplands around Mount Oriel.

Location

Ferrard is found in south County Louth, between the White River, River Boyne and Mattock River.

Ferrard barony is bordered to the north by Ardee; to the west by Lower Slane, Upper Slane, County Meath and to the south by Drogheda and Lower Duleek, County Meath.

History
Ferrard derives its name from Fera Arda, or Fatharta, the ancient home of the Fir Arda Ciannachta.

List of settlements

Below is a list of settlements in Ferrard barony:
Clogherhead
Collon
Termonfeckin
Tullyallen

See also
Viscount Massereene and Ferrard

References

Baronies of County Louth